Farak (also Romanized as Fark and Fork; also known as Farg) is a village in Khenejin Rural District, in the Central District of Komijan County, Markazi Province, Iran. At the 2006 census, its population was 259, in 51 families.  The inhabitants speak Tati

References 

Populated places in Komijan County